Unqualified, aldolase usually refers to the enzyme fructose-bisphosphate aldolase.

Aldolase may also refer to:

Proteins serving as fructose-bisphosphate aldolase
 Aldolase A
 Aldolase B
 Aldolase C

Other enzymes called "aldolases"
 17a-hydroxyprogesterone aldolase
 2-dehydro-3-deoxy-6-phosphogalactonate aldolase
 2-dehydro-3-deoxy-D-pentonate aldolase
 2-dehydro-3-deoxyglucarate aldolase
 2-dehydro-3-deoxy-L-pentonate aldolase
 2-dehydro-3-deoxy-phosphogluconate aldolase
 2-dehydropantoate aldolase
 3-deoxy-D-manno-octulosonate aldolase
 4-(2-carboxyphenyl)-2-oxobut-3-enoate aldolase
 5-dehydro-2-deoxyphosphogluconate aldolase
 Benzoin aldolase
 Deoxyribose-phosphate aldolase
 Dihydroneopterin aldolase
 Dimethylaniline-N-oxide aldolase
 Ketotetrose-phosphate aldolase
 Lactate aldolase
 L-fuculose-phosphate aldolase
 Phenylserine aldolase
 Rhamnulose-1-phosphate aldolase
 Sphinganine-1-phosphate aldolase
 Tagatose-bisphosphate aldolase
 Threonine aldolase
 Trimethylamine-oxide aldolase

Enzymes